Kai John Oliver Milton McKenzie-Lyle (born 30 November 1997) is a professional footballer who plays for Welling United as a goalkeeper. Born in England, he represents Guyana at international level.

Club career

Barnet
McKenzie-Lyle joined Tottenham Hotspur as under-10, before he moved to Barnet as an under-14 and progressed through the club's academy to become first choice keeper for the under-18s, and made his senior debut with a start in a 3–0 Herts Senior Cup defeat to Bishop's Stortford on 21 January 2014. He first appeared on the bench in the league in October 2014. He made his English Football League debut on 12 September 2015 in a 3–1 League Two away defeat by Portsmouth, coming on as a substitute for John Akinde after regular goalkeeper Jamie Stephens had been sent-off. McKenzie-Lyle joined St Ives Town in August 2017 on loan. He then joined Hayes & Yeading United on loan in December 2017.

Liverpool
McKenzie-Lyle joined Liverpool on trial in July 2018. He then signed for the Reds the following month. McKenzie-Lyle was released in June 2020, having played just twice for the under-23s in Premier League 2.

Cambridge United
On 1 September 2020, McKenzie-Lyle joined League Two club Cambridge United on a two-year deal. On 25 March 2022, Chelmsford City announced the signing of McKenzie-Lyle on loan.

McKenzie-Lyle was released by the club at the end of the 2021–22 season.

Non-league
McKenzie-Lyle joined Welling United in August 2022.

International career
McKenzie-Lyle was called up to Guyana's squad for their third round matches of 2017 Caribbean Cup qualification, after being alerted to his eligibility by Jack Thorpe, a researcher for the Football Manager game. He made an unusual international debut for a goalkeeper, scoring a header in the 120th minute of a 3–2 loss against Suriname. On his second appearance he saved a penalty against Jamaica.

Personal life
McKenzie-Lyle's younger brother Renell (born 2000) is also a goalkeeper and product of the youth system at Barnet.

Career statistics

Club

International

Scores and results list Guyana's goal tally first, score column indicates score after each McKenzie-Lyle goal.

|+ List of international goals scored by Kai McKenzie-Lyle
|-
| style="text-align:center"|1 || 8 October 2016 || André Kamperveen Stadion, Paramaribo, Suriname ||  || style="text-align:center"|2 || style="text-align:center"|2–3 ||  2017 Caribbean Cup qualification || 
|-
|}

References

External links

1997 births
Living people
Guyanese footballers
Guyana international footballers
English footballers
English people of Guyanese descent
Barnet F.C. players
Cockfosters F.C. players
St Ives Town F.C. players
Hayes & Yeading United F.C. players
Liverpool F.C. players
Cambridge United F.C. players
Chelmsford City F.C. players
Welling United F.C. players
Association football goalkeepers
English Football League players
Southern Football League players
National League (English football) players
Black British sportspeople
Footballers from the London Borough of Haringey